Natura is a populated place in Okmulgee County, Oklahoma.  It is located about 10 miles north of the City of Okmulgee off State Highway 16, east of both the town of Beggs and  US-75.

The post office was established in 1905, but only remained open until 1910.  While now primarily residential, the area was the location of the now-closed Natura Winery, and is still the location of the Natura Baptist Church.

References 

Unincorporated communities in Okmulgee County, Oklahoma